Channel Express (Air Services) Limited was an airline with its head office in Building 470 at Bournemouth International Airport in Christchurch, Dorset, near Bournemouth. It operated scheduled services from Bournemouth to the Channel Islands and nightly cargo services to Europe and throughout the UK on behalf of Royal Mail and other overnight express carriers. Short notice and ad hoc charters were also operated throughout Europe, the Middle East and North Africa, as well as wet-lease operations on behalf of major scheduled airlines. Its main base was Bournemouth International Airport (BOH).

In January 2006 the name Channel Express was dropped, and the company rebranded entirely to become Jet2, the name given to the company's successful low-cost airline.

History
The airline was established in January 1978 and started operations in 1978. It started with daily services to the Channel Islands under the name of Express Air Services using Handley Page Dart Herald aircraft. After securing Post Office contracts in the early 1980s the airline adopted the Channel Express name in 1983. In 2002 Channel Express established its low-cost brand Jet2, whose name it took in January 2006.

Fleet
As of 2005 the Channel Express fleet was made up of:
3 Fokker F27
6 Airbus A300
17 Boeing 737
2 Boeing 757
5 Lockheed L-188 Electra

Destinations
Belgium
Brussels - Brussels Airport
Czech Republic
Prague - Prague Ruzyně International Airport
Denmark
Copenhagen - Copenhagen Airport
Finland
Helsinki - Helsinki Airport
France
Nice - Nice Côte d'Azur Airport
Paris - Charles de Gaulle Airport
Toulouse - Toulouse–Blagnac Airport
Germany
Cologne - Cologne/Bonn Airport
Guernsey
Guernsey - Guernsey Airport
Ireland
Dublin - Dublin Airport
Waterford - Waterford Airport
Italy
Milan - Milan Malpensa Airport
Naples - Naples International Airport
Rome - Leonardo da Vinci–Fiumicino Airport
Jersey
Jersey - Jersey Airport
Kosovo
Pristina - Pristina International Airport Adem Jashari
Malta
Luqa - Malta International Airport
Netherlands
Amsterdam - Amsterdam Airport Schiphol
Poland
Warsaw - Warsaw Chopin Airport
Portugal
Funchal - Cristiano Ronaldo International Airport
Lisbon - Lisbon Airport
Spain
Barcelona - Josep Tarradellas Barcelona–El Prat Airport
Palma de Mallorca - Palma de Mallorca Airport
Murcia - Murcia–San Javier Airport
United Kingdom
Aberdeen - Aberdeen Dyce Airport
Bournemouth - Bournemouth Airport
Nottingham - East Midlands Airport
Edinburgh - Edinburgh Airport
London - Gatwick Airport
London - London Stansted Airport
Manchester - Manchester Airport

See also
 List of defunct airlines of the United Kingdom

References

External links

Jet2.com Limited
Channel Express Fleet Detail

Defunct airlines of the Channel Islands
Defunct airlines of the United Kingdom
Airlines established in 1978
Airlines disestablished in 2002